is a Japanese former competitive figure skater. He won the Japanese national title in the 1978–79 season and competed at two Winter Olympics, placing 11th in 1976 (Innsbruck) and 8th in 1980 (Lake Placid, New York). He also appeared at seven World Championships, achieving his best results, 6th, at the 1980 Worlds in Dortmund. After retiring from competition, he became a coach.

Competitive highlights

References

1957 births
Living people
Japanese male single skaters
Olympic figure skaters of Japan
Figure skaters at the 1976 Winter Olympics
Figure skaters at the 1980 Winter Olympics